

The Angus Aquila was a 1930s British single-seat low-wing monoplane designed and built by Arthur Leighton Angus. It had an open cockpit and was powered by a  Salmson AD.9 radial engine. The Aquila was registered G-ABIK and test flown in early 1931 at Hanworth Aerodrome near London but it was destroyed in a crash on 21 March 1931 killing Angus.

Specifications

References
Notes

Sources

1930s British civil utility aircraft
Low-wing aircraft
Aircraft first flown in 1931
Aviation accidents and incidents in England